{{Speciesbox
| image = Dicranolaius bellulus - inat 54434162.jpg
| image_caption = Dicranolaius bellulus, Australia
| genus = Dicranolaius
| species = bellulus
| authority = (Boisduval, 1835)
| synonyms_ref = 
| synonyms = Laius cyanocephalus 
Laius nidicola 
Laius intermedius 
Laius orcicornis 
Malachius bellulus 
}}Dicranolaius bellulus (common name - Red and blue beetle''') is a species of soft-winged flower beetle in the family Melyridae, found in Australia, in all mainland states and territories. It was first (partially) described in 1830 by Félix Édouard Guérin-Méneville as Malachius bellulus with the publication ot illustrations. [Text; Zoologie 2(2), Division 1] (plates 1 and 2 of “Insectes” published in 1830; text in 1838). However, Guérin-Méneville completed the description with the publication of a text in 1838. Consequently, the Australian Faunal Directory considers the first valid publication to be that of Jean Baptiste Boisduval in 1835 (as Malachius bellulus'').  Taxonomic reasons for the various synonyms are given in a 2017 paper by Liu, Slipinski and Pang.

References

External links

 
Dicranolaius bellulus occurrence data from GBIF

Melyridae
Taxa described in 1835
Taxa named by Jean Baptiste Boisduval